"Finally Feel Good" is a song by British singer-songwriter James Arthur. It was released as a digital download and for streaming on 27 September 2019, as the fifth single from Arthur's studio third album, You. The song was written by Eric Frederic, James Arthur, Justin Tranter, Scott Harper and produced by Ricky Reed.

Critical reception
Mike Wass of Idolator stated that the song is a "cathartic ode about making peace with yourself".

Track listing

Charts

Release history

References

2019 singles
2019 songs
James Arthur songs
Songs written by Ricky Reed
Songs written by James Arthur
Songs written by Justin Tranter